Walter Clarence "Dub" Taylor Jr. (February 26, 1907 – October 3, 1994), was an American character actor who from the 1940s into the 1990s worked extensively in films and on television, often in Westerns but also in comedies. He is the father of actor and painter Buck Taylor.

Early life
Taylor was born February 26, 1907, in Richmond, Virginia, the middle child of five children of Minnie and Walter C. Taylor, Sr. According to the federal census of 1920, he had two older sisters, Minnie Marg[aret] and Maud, a younger brother named George, and a little sister, Edna Fay. The family moved to Augusta, Georgia, around 1912, when Walter was five years old, and lived there until he was 13. Taylor's mother was a Pennsylvania native; and his father, who worked in Augusta at that time as a cotton broker, was from North Carolina. While in Georgia as a boy, Walter, Jr. got his lifelong nickname when his friends began calling him "W", then shortened it further to "Dub".

Film work

A vaudeville performer, Taylor made his film debut in 1938 as the cheerful ex-football captain Ed Carmichael in Frank Capra's You Can't Take It with You. He secured the part because the role required an actor who could play tuned percussion. During the 1950s and early 1960s, he used his xylophone skills on several television shows, including the syndicated series Ranch Party.

In 1939, he appeared in the film Taming of the West, where he originated the character of Cannonball, a role he played for the next 10 years in over 50 films. Cannonball was a comedic sidekick to Wild Bill Elliott in 13 features. He played the character in other westerns starring Charles Starrett, Russell Hayden, Tex Ritter and Jimmy Wakely. Taylor later dropped the Cannonball name because he felt it held him back from roles in films with larger budgets.

He had bit parts in a number of classic motion pictures, including Mr. Smith Goes to Washington (1939), A Star Is Born (1954) and Them! (1954).

The 1954 film Dragnet had Taylor in an uncredited role, that of gangster Miller Starkie, who is killed in the opening scene. He had a small role in the 1958 Walt Disney film Tonka as a rustler of stray horses for sale. The same year, he performed in No Time for Sergeants as the representative of the draft board who summoned Will Stockdale (Andy Griffith) from his rural home in Georgia to the United States Air Force.

He later joined Sam Peckinpah's stock company in 1965's Major Dundee, playing a professional horse thief. He also appeared in The Wild Bunch (1969) as a minister who gets his flock shot in the film's opening scene; in Junior Bonner (1972), The Getaway (1972), and Pat Garrett and Billy the Kid (1973) as an aging, eccentric outlaw friend of Billy's; and in Michael Cimino's crime film Thunderbolt and Lightfoot (1974), He also played Ivan Moss, father of Michael J. Pollard's character C. W. Moss, in Bonnie and Clyde (1967).

He portrayed an ill-tempered chuckwagon cook in the 1969 film The Undefeated, starring John Wayne and Rock Hudson, and appeared in Support Your Local Gunfighter (1971) as the drunken Doc Shultz.

He appeared in Back to the Future Part III (1990) with veteran Western actors Pat Buttram and Harry Carey Jr. Taylor's last film role was in Maverick (1994), and although he had only a fleeting appearance as an unnamed "Room Clerk", his name appears in the film's opening credits.

Television work

In the 1950s, he guest-starred three times on the syndicated series The Range Rider, starring Jock Mahoney and Dick Jones. He appeared in the 1955 episode "The Outlander" of Cheyenne, and on the syndicated series Death Valley Days playing the Colorado silver miner "Chicken Bill" Lovell.

In 1957, Taylor was cast alongside Alan Hale, Jr., in the syndicated Casey Jones TV series. He played in the 1961 Perry Mason episode "The Case of the Grumbling Grandfather". Taylor was on The Lloyd Bridges Show (1962–1963), in the episodes "My Child Is Yet a Stranger" and "The Tyrees of Capital Hill". He was in The Andy Griffith Show, first as the preacher who marries Charlene Darling to Dud Wash, then as postmaster Talbert, and next as the brother-in-law of town handyman Emmett Clark.

Taylor performed on other sitcoms, including Hazel with Shirley Booth. His character, Mitch Brady, was owner of a local cab company and a frequent boyfriend of Hazel's. He was cast in an episode of I Love Lucy, and on The Brian Keith Show, and in a fourth-season episode of The Cosby Show. He was on NBC's series Laredo and The High Chaparral.

Taylor played Houston Lamb in four episodes of Little House On The Prairie in seasons six and seven (1979 to 1981). He appeared on Hee Haw for six seasons, from 1985 to 1991, where he was mostly seen as a regular in the Lulu's Truck Stop skit featuring Lulu Roman and Gailard Sartain. Taylor was in several episodes of Designing Women as a rustic enamored with the women from Sugarbaker's during a camping expedition.

Starting in the late 1970s, Taylor appeared in a series of Western-style commercials for Hubba Bubba bubble gum. In the radio versions of the commercials, his character was named "The Geezer".

In 1994, he appeared in a commercial for Pace Foods, performing as one of four participants in a fair's "Dip-Off" contest, where  two other competitors and he use their "secret ingredient" of Pace Picante Sauce in their dips. When the fourth participant holds up a jar of "Mexican sauce" as a "secret ingredient", Taylor's character proclaims that it was "made in New York City!"

Death
Taylor died of a heart attack on October 3, 1994, in Los Angeles. He was cremated, and his ashes were scattered near Westlake Village, California.

Selected filmography

Film
 
You Can't Take It with You (1938) as Ed Carmichael
Mr. Smith Goes to Washington (1939) as Reporter (uncredited)
The Taming of the West (1939)
  The Return of Wild Bill   (1940) as Cannonball
Prairie Schooners (1940) as Cannonball
The Wildcat of Tucson (1940) as Cannonball
The Return of Daniel Boone (1941) as Cannonball
Hands Across the Rockies (1941) as Cannonball Taylor
The Son of Davy Crockett (1941) as Cannonball
Tanks a Million (1941) as Malloy (uncredited)
The Lone Prairie (1942) as Cannonball
  Riders of the Northwest Mounted  (1943) as Cannonball
Saddles and Sagebrush (1943) as Cannonball
What's Buzzin', Cousin? (1943) as Jed (uncredited)
Minesweeper (1943) as Seaman Stubby Gordon (uncredited)
Cowboy in the Clouds (1943) as Cannonball
Saddle Leather Law (1944) as Cannonball
Cowboy Canteen (1944) as Cannonball
The Last Horseman (1944) as Cannonball
Cyclone Prairie Rangers (1944) as Cannonball
Both Barrels Blazing (1945) as Cannonball
Rustlers of the Badlands (1945) as Cannonball
Courtin' Trouble (1948) as Cannonball
Cowboy Cavalier (1948) as Cannonball
Song of the Drifter (1948) as Cannonball
Silver Trails (1948) as Cannonball
Across the Rio Grande (1949) as Cannonball Taylor
Brand of Fear (1949) as Cannonball 
Riding High (1950) as Joe
Lure of the Wilderness (1952) as Sheriff Jepson (uncredited)
The Story of Will Rogers (1952) as Actor (scenes deleted)
Woman of the North Country (1952) as Bob (uncredited)
The Charge at Feather River (1953) as Danowicz
Those Redheads from Seattle (1953) as Townsman (uncredited)
Crime Wave (1953) as Gus Snider 
Riding Shotgun (1954) as Eddie (uncredited)
Them! (1954) as Railroad Yard Watchman (uncredited)
Dragnet (1954) as Miller Starkie (uncredited)
The Bounty Hunter (1954) as Eli Danvers 
A Star Is Born (1954) as Norman's Driver (voice, uncredited)
Tall Man Riding (1955) as Townsman (uncredited)
The McConnell Story (1955) as Angry Technical Sergeant (uncredited)
I Died a Thousand Times (1955) as Ed (uncredited)
The Fastest Gun Alive (1956) as Nolan Brown (uncredited)
Tension at Table Rock (1956) as Ruffian (uncredited)
You Can't Run Away from It (1956) as Joe
No Time for Sergeants (1958) as McKinney
Hot Rod Gang (1958) as Al Berrywhiff
Street of Darkness (1958) as Duffy Tyler
Auntie Mame (1958) as County Veterinarian (uncredited)
A Hole in the Head (1959) as Fred
Home from the Hill (1960) as Bob Skaggs (uncredited)
Parrish (1961) as Teet Howie
Sweet Bird of Youth (1962) as Dan Hatcher
Black Gold (1962) as Doc
Spencer's Mountain (1963) as Percy Cook
Major Dundee (1965) as Priam
The Hallelujah Trail (1965) as Clayton Howell
The Cincinnati Kid (1965) as First Dealer
The Adventures of Bullwhip Griffin (1967) as Timekeeper
Don't Make Waves (1967) as Electrician
Bonnie and Clyde (1967) as Ivan Moss
Johnny Banco (1967) 
The Money Jungle (1967) as Pete Jensen
Bandolero! (1968) as Attendant
The Shakiest Gun in the West (1968) as Pop McGovern
Death of a Gunfighter (1969) as Doc Adams
The Wild Bunch (1969) as Wainscoat
The Learning Tree (1969) as Spikey
The Undefeated (1969) as McCartney
The Reivers (1969) as Dr. B.F. Peabody
...tick...tick...tick... (1970) as Junior
The Liberation of L.B. Jones (1970) as Mayor
A Man Called Horse (1970) as Joe
The Wild Country (1970) as Phil
Support Your Local Gunfighter (1971) as Doc Schultz
Man and Boy (1971) as Atkins
Evel Knievel (1971) as Turquoise Smith
Wild in the Sky (1972) as Officer Roddenberry
Junior Bonner (1972) as Del
The Getaway (1972) as Laughlin
Country Blue (1973) as Jumpy Belk
Tom Sawyer (1973) as Clayton
Pat Garrett and Billy the Kid (1973) as Josh
Thunderbolt and Lightfoot (1974) as Station Attendant 
The Fortune (1975) as Rattlesnake Tom
Poor Pretty Eddie (1975) as Justice of the Peace Floyd
Hearts of the West (1975) as Nevada Ticket Agent
Creature from Black Lake (1976) as Grandpaw Bridges
Burnt Offerings (1976) as Walker
Treasure of Matecumbe (1976) as Sheriff Forbes
Pony Express Rider (1976) as Boomer Riley 
Gator (1976) as Mayor Caffey
The Winds of Autumn (1976) as Rattler S. Gravley
The Great Smokey Roadblock (1977) as Harley Davidson
Moonshine County Express (1977) as Uncle Bill
The Rescuers (1977) as Digger (voice)
Beartooth (1978)
They Went That-A-Way & That-A-Way (1978) as Gunner
1941 (1979) as Mr. Malcomb
Used Cars (1980) as Tucker
Cannonball Run II (1984) as Sheriff
The Best of Times (1986) as Mac
Once Upon a Texas Train (1988, TV Movie) as Charlie Lee
Back to the Future Part III (1990) as Levi, Saloon Old-Timer #1
Conagher (1991, TV Movie) as Station Agent
My Heroes Have Always Been Cowboys (1991) as Gimme Cap
Falling from Grace (1992) as Grandpa Parks
Maverick (1994) as Room Clerk (final film role)

Television
I Love Lucy (1955), season 5, episode 8, titled "Lucy Goes to the Rodeo", as Rattlesnake Jones
Casey Jones (1957-1958) as Wallie Sims, 32 episodes
Twilight Zone (1962) season 3, episode 23 titled "The Last Rites of Jeff Myrtlebank" as Mr. Peters
Dennis the Menace (1960), season 1, episode 22, titled "Dennis and the TV Set" as Opie 
Hazel (1962-1963), as Mitch Brady, 4 episodes
The Andy Griffith Show (1963), season 3, episode 31 titled "Mountain Wedding" as The Preacher
My Favorite Martian (1964), season 1, episode 15, titled "Poor Litter Rich Cat", 
Please Don't Eat the Daisies (1965), as Ed Hewley, 5 episodes
The Wild Wild West (1965), season 1, episode 5, "The Night of the Casual Killer", as Guard
The Monroes (1966-1967) as Cyrus, 2 episodes
The Wild Wild West (1967), season 3, episode 15, "The Night of the Running Death", as Pete
Bonanza (1967-1971), 6 episodes as Barlow / Simon / Otto / Luke Calhoun
Gunsmoke (1967-1970) as Farnum / Rev. Finney Cox / Noah Riker / Bartender / Cook / Sonny Starr
Partridge Family (1971), season 2, episode 6, “Whatever Happened To Moby Dick” as Flicker
Emergency! (1973) season 2, episode 16, "Syndrome"  as an old man
Little House on the Prairie (1980), 4 episodes as Houston Lamb
Darkroom (1981), season 1, episode 2, titled "Uncle George"
The Cosby Show (1988), season 4, episode 16
Designing Women (1989), episode 'The Nightmare From HeeHaw', season 4, episode 4Andy Griffith

References

External links
 
 
 
 Press Release for "That Guy: The Legacy of Dub Taylor"
 
 "Dub "Cannonball" Taylor tribute by Bobby J. Copeland
 Parker Brothers Gun Company

1907 births
1994 deaths
American male film actors
American male television actors
Male actors from Augusta, Georgia
Vaudeville performers
Male Western (genre) film actors
Male actors from Richmond, Virginia
Male actors from Los Angeles
20th-century American male actors